The Festa do Peão de Boiadeiro (Portuguese for Cowboy's Peasant Party) or simply Cowboy Festival is a popular festival which includes an American bull riding and barrel racing rodeo and country music concert set. It is located in Barretos, São Paulo, Brazil.

Other festivals like it are very common and popular in Brazil, highlighting the festivals held in the following locations: Andrelândia, Uberaba, Goiânia, Redenção, Araçatuba and Marabá.

References

Rodeos
Animal festival or ritual
Country music festivals in Brazil